{{DISPLAYTITLE:C20H34}}
The molecular formula C20H34 (molar mass: 274.49 g/mol, exact mass: 274.2661 u) may refer to:

 19-Norpregnane, or 13β-methyl-17β-ethylgonane
 Phyllocladane
 Tigliane

Molecular formulas